Bahman Jan or Bahmanjan may refer to:
 Bahman Jan-e Olya
 Bahman Jan-e Sofla